The Talented Athlete Scholarship Scheme, known as TASS, is a scheme of Sport England (UK government-funded) to find and support prospective talented athletes.

History
Over five hundred athletes are supported by this scheme, in around thirty sports (in high performance sport). The scheme began in 2004.

Operation
It is run by Northumbria University in Newcastle upon Tyne. Athletes are over 16. Prospective athletes are nominated by the national governing body for that sport. These athletes are at the top of their Sport England Talent Pathway, and must be in full-time education.

Athletes are nominated only by the governing bodies, and cannot make individual applications. The scheme is largely delivered by English universities. The scholarship is worth up to £3,500 a year.

Some athletes can also be funded (additionally) through UK Sport.

Scheme funding
The scheme is part of the SportsAid network, and receives funding from the National Lottery.

See also
 British Olympic Association
 English Institute of Sport 
 Youth Sport Trust, also provides funding for athletes aged 12 to 18

References

External links
 TASS at the UK Government
 Delivery sites

2004 establishments in England
Funding bodies of England
Higher education organisations based in the United Kingdom
National sports institutions
Organisations based in Tyne and Wear
Scholarships in the United Kingdom
Sport at Northumbria University
Sport in Tyne and Wear
Sports organisations of England
Youth sport in England